Kamewal  is a village in Kapurthala district of Punjab State, India. The village is administrated by a Sarpanch who is an elected representative.

Demography 
According to the report published by Census India in 2011, Kamewal has 26 houses with the total population of 132 persons of which 64 are male and 68 females. Literacy rate of  Kamewal is 63.96%, lower than the state average of 75.84%.  The population of children in the age group 0–6 years is 21 which is 15.91% of the total population. Child sex ratio is approximately 1100, higher than the state average of 846.

Population data

References

External links
  Villages in Kapurthala
 Kapurthala Villages List

Villages in Kapurthala district